Arras 1918 was a battle honour awarded to units of the British and Imperial Armies that took part in one or more of the following engagements in World War I:
First Battle of Arras (28 March 1918)
Second Battle of Arras (26 August – 3 September 1918)

References

Battle honours of the British Army
Battle honours of the King's Royal Rifle Corps